Balazs Gardi is a Hungarian-born, American-based photographer. In 2008, Gardi received two 1st Prizes in the World Press Photo Awards and won the Photojournalism prize in the Bayeux-Calvados Award for War Correspondents for his work from Afghanistan.

Education 

Photography career 
Gardi started working as a photographer for the daily newspaper Népszabadság around 2000. In the mid-2000s, he spent two years documenting the Roma (Gypsy) minorities, photographing the often impoverished and discriminated peoples throughout a dozen Eastern European countries. His photographs have appeared publications including Harper's Magazine, National Geographic, The New York Times, Wired, Time, Outside, The Atlantic, Newsweek, and The Guardian.

His series titled "Thirst," depicts human civilization in water stressed areas. The Thirst series is part of Facing Water Crisis, Gardi's project documenting the impact of human population growth on water scarcity.

In 2010 and 2011, he documented the First Battalion, Eighth Marines, throughout their deployment in southern Afghanistan’s war-torn deserts, in collaboration with Basetrack Live. In Afghanistan, Gardi also experimented with using an iPhone as his primary camera, publishing a photo essay in Foreign Policy titled "The War in Hipstamatic".

In 2011, Gardi travelled to rural KwaZulu-Natal Province of South Africa to document the communities who live there. His work there was supported by a Magnum Foundation Fund grant. 

In 2021, Gardi photographed the 2021 storming of the United States Capitol on assignment for The New Yorker. Gardi's photographs accompanied an article titled "The Storm" by Luke Mogelson in the print edition of the January 25, 2021, issue.

Awards 
2005: Getty Images Grant for Editorial Photography to continue his work with the Roma community
2006: Alexia foundation professional prize, for his series Afghanistan - Between War And Peace
2008: Winner, Photojournalism prize, Bayeux-Calvados Award for War Correspondents, for photographs from the war zones in Afghanistan.
2008: 1st Prize, General News, Stories category from World Press Photo
2008: 1st Prize, General News, Singles category, World Press Photo
2009: Winner, Global Vision Award, Pictures of the Year International, for his "Thirst" series 
2018: A Sony World Photography Award for his work featuring Afghani Buzkashi players.

References

External links 
"Men are Scum": Inside Facebook's War on Hate Speech - Vanity Fair - photographs by Balazs Gardi
Among the Insurrectionists - photographs by Balazs Gardi

American photojournalists
War photographers
Photography in Afghanistan
Environmental photography
Photography in South Africa
Hungarian photojournalists
Year of birth missing (living people)
Living people